False White Mountain is a mountain, in the northern part of Yosemite National Park. It is the 24th highest mountain, in Yosemite National Park. False White Mountain can be climbed, as a day hike, from Tioga Pass.

False White Mountain is near Mount Conness, Tioga Peak, Mount Dana, and Lembert Dome, thus is in the Tuolumne Meadows area.

Of importance, False White Mountain has been often confused with White Mountain, thus the "false" reference.

There have been proposals, to re-name False White Mountain, as Peak 12,002, Sharsmith Peak, False White, and False White Mountain Peak.

Climate
False White Mountain is located in an alpine climate zone. Most weather fronts originate in the Pacific Ocean, and travel east toward the Sierra Nevada mountains. As fronts approach, they are forced upward by the peaks (orographic lift), causing moisture in the form of rain or snowfall to drop onto the range.

See also
 
 Geology of the Yosemite area

Gallery

References

Mountains of Yosemite National Park
Mountains of Madera County, California
North American 3000 m summits
Mountains of Northern California
Sierra Nevada (United States)